Cainnear is a female given name of ancient Irish origin. It is a variant of the original name Cainder or Cainir which means kind/gentle daughter from the Irish caoin meaning kind, gentle or good and der meaning daughter. It was a fairly popular name in medieval Ireland and several women including many early Irish saints have borne this name.

Bearers of the Name Cainnear/Cainder

Cainnear, a daughter of Queen Medbh of Connaught called Red Cainnear, she was killed with a spear, saving her mother.

St. Cainnear of Inis Cathaig, an Irish virgin and a recluse. Her feast day is 28 January

St. Cainnear of Rinn-hAllaidh, an early Irish virgin saint. Her feast day is 5 November.

St. Cainnear of Cluain Claraid, an Irish virgin and an abbess who was healed of muteness by St. Brendan. Her feast day is 6 November

St. Cainnear of Clonsilla, the mother of St. Mochua of Clondalkin and six other male saints. Her feast day is 6 August

St. Cainnear of Kirkinner, a Scottish virgin who was a recluse and possibly also a martyr. Her feast day is 29 October.

St. Cainnear of Cill Chainre (Kilcandra, Co. Wicklow). Her feast day is 6 November.

References

Irish given names